Evocation I: The Arcane Dominion is the third studio album by Swiss folk metal band Eluveitie. It was released on 17 April 2009 through Nuclear Blast. Contrary to their previous works, this album is almost entirely acoustic. The vocals are primarily handled by hurdy-gurdy player Anna Murphy. The album cover represents Cernunnos, a Celtic deity of nature.
The lyrics are partly based on Gaulish inscriptions, e.g. "A Girl's Oath" uses the text of the Larzac tablet, and "Dessumiis Luge" that of the Chamalières tablet.

Background

Vocalist Chrigel Glanzmann has said about the album:

"As Evocation I - The Arcane Dominion is a concept album setting pure gaulish mythology into music, we also wanted the artwork to be in the same line. Kernunnos is one of the most important and central characters in celtic mythology, so we conceived a topical portrayal of that figure, representing the ancient mythological content of Evocation I: The Arcane Dominion, as well as its musical character."

Track listing

Credits

 Chrigel Glanzmann – tin and low whistles, mandola, mandolin, uilleann pipes, bodhrán, vocals
 Anna Murphy – hurdy-gurdy, flute, lead vocals
 Ivo Henzi – acoustic guitars
 Päde Kistler – tin and low whistles, Scottish highland pipe, redpipe
 Meri Tadić – fiddle, vocals
 Kay Brem – acoustic and fretless bass
 Sime Koch – acoustic guitars
 Merlin Sutter – drums, percussion

Guest musicians
 Freddy Schnyder - hammered dulcimer on "Within the Grove" and "Gobanno"
 Mina The Fiddler - 5-stringed viola on "Within the Grove" and "Gobanno"
 Oliver s. Tyr - longnecked lute on "The Arcane Dominion"
 Alan Nemtheanga - additional voice and vocals "Sacrapos- At First Glance" and "Nata"
 Sarah Wauquiez - zugerörgeli on "Gobanno"

Production
 Arranged by Eluveitie
 Engineered by Chrigel Glanzmann and Merlin Sutter
 Mixed in January 2009 at Finnvox Studios, Helsinki, Finland by Arto Tuunela of Major Label
 Mastered in January 2009 at Finnvox Studios, Helsinki, Finland by Mika Jussila
 Produced by Arto Tuunela and Eluveitie
 
The drums, guitars, bass, bagpipes, fiddle, hurdy-gurdy, flute, percussion, and vocals were recorded in December 2008 at Devils Studio, Vaduz/Liechtenstein. These recordings were engineered by Merlin Sutter. The tin whistles, low whistles, mandola, mandolin, bodhran, hammered dulcimer, 5-stringed viola, zugerörgeli, and sound effects were recorded in December 2008 in Illnau Switzerland. These recordings were engineered by Chrigel Glanzmann.

Chart performance

References

2009 albums
Eluveitie albums
Nuclear Blast albums